Bandwar, also called Vandwar or Banduar, is a village in Begusarai district of Bihar, a state in India.

Geography 
It is located in the Indo-Gangetic plain region of India.

The only river that flows through the village is the Burhi Gandak River.

Due to the river being prone to floods, a levee, referred to as “Bandh” (Hindi: बांध) by local residents, has been constructed parallel to the Burhi Gandak River to prevent flooding of the adjoining countryside.

Transport 

A bridge on the Burhi Gandak River called the Chhatauna Bridge connects the village to other villages on the northern bank of the river.

Demographics 
The village has 12,943 residents, 6,796 male and 6,147 female.

53 percent of the village is illiterate.

References 

Villages in Begusarai district